The Spell House is a historic home in Titusville, Florida, United States. It is located at 1200 Riverside Drive. On January 12, 1990, it was added to the U.S. National Register of Historic Places.

References

External links
Brevard County listings at National Register of Historic Places
Brevard County listings at Florida's Office of Cultural and Historical Programs

Houses in Brevard County, Florida
National Register of Historic Places in Brevard County, Florida
Buildings and structures in Titusville, Florida